Anacamptomyiini is a tribe of flies in the family Tachinidae.

Genera
Anacamptomyia Bischof, 1904
Euvespivora Baranov, 1942
Isochaetina Mesnil, 1950
Koralliomyia Mesnil, 1950
Leucocarcelia Villeneuve, 1921
Parapales Mesnil, 1950

References

Diptera of Asia
Diptera of Africa
Diptera of Australasia
Exoristinae
Brachycera tribes